Askeaton is an unincorporated community located in the town of Holland, Brown County, Wisconsin, United States. Askeaton is located southeast of Wrightstown at the intersection of County Z and St. Pat's Church Road. The town hall for the Town of Holland is located in Askeaton.

Etymology
The name Askeaton is of Ojibwe origin. It is derived from ashkiodon 'raw mouth'.

"Askeaton" is also the name of a small village in southwestern Ireland near Limerick. By the late 1800s, a large number of Irish immigrants had immigrated to this area of Brown County, and founded one of Askeaton's most prominent landmarks, St. Patrick's Church. St. Patrick's church is served by priests of St. Clare's parish.

Images

References

Unincorporated communities in Brown County, Wisconsin
Unincorporated communities in Wisconsin
Green Bay metropolitan area